Naa Anang (born 10 March 1995) is an Australian athlete specialising in the long jump. She represented her country at the 2017 World Championships without reaching the final. In addition, she won a bronze medal at the 2015 Summer Universiade.

Her personal best in the event is 6.81 metres set in Sydney in 2019.

International competitions

References

External links
 
 Naa Anang at Australian Athletics Historical Results
 
 

1995 births
Living people
Australian female long jumpers
World Athletics Championships athletes for Australia
Athletes (track and field) at the 2018 Commonwealth Games
Sportspeople from Accra
Australian people of Ghanaian descent
People educated at Brisbane State High School
Australian Athletics Championships winners
Commonwealth Games competitors for Australia
Athletes (track and field) at the 2022 Commonwealth Games
Universiade bronze medalists in athletics (track and field)
Universiade bronze medalists for Australia
21st-century Australian women